Today is a 2014 Iranian drama film directed by Reza Mirkarimi. It was screened in the Contemporary World Cinema section at the 2014 Toronto International Film Festival. It was selected as the Iranian entry for the Best Foreign Language Film at the 87th Academy Awards, but was not nominated.

Cast
 Parviz Parastui as Younes
 Soheila Golestani
 Shabnam Moghaddami
 Roozbeh Hesari
 Ashkan Jenabi
 Hesam Mahmoudi
 Ava Sharifi

See also
 List of submissions to the 87th Academy Awards for Best Foreign Language Film
 List of Iranian submissions for the Academy Award for Best Foreign Language Film

References

External links
 
 Toronto International Film Festival official programme note

2014 films
2014 drama films
Iranian drama films
2010s Persian-language films
Films directed by Reza Mirkarimi